Fontimonas is a Gram-negative genus of bacteria from the family of Sinobacteraceae with one known species (Fontimonas thermophila). Fontimonas thermophila has been isolated from a hot spring from the Hot Springs National Park in the United States.

References

Gammaproteobacteria
Bacteria genera
Monotypic bacteria genera